John Walter Findlay (12 February 1866 – 1 August 1943) was a Progressive party member of the House of Commons of Canada. He was born in Portage-du-Fort, Quebec and became a farmer.

From 1915 to 1917, Findlay served as a councillor of Brant Township, Ontario. From 1918 to 1921, he was deputy reeve of that township.

He was elected to Parliament at the Bruce South riding in the 1921 general election. After serving his only federal term, the 14th Canadian Parliament, Findlay was defeated by Walter Allan Hall of the Liberals.

External links
 

1866 births
1943 deaths
Canadian farmers
Members of the House of Commons of Canada from Ontario
Ontario municipal councillors
Progressive Party of Canada MPs